Clement Abdul Latif (born 20 November 2001) is a Ghanaian professional footballer who plays as a midfielder for Ghanaian Premier League side Dreams F.C.

Career 
Latif has been playing for Dreams FC since 2018. He was promoted to the senior team during the 2019 GFA Normalization Committee Special Competition. On 7 April 2019, he made his debut coming on in the 47th minute for Cletus Nombil Daho in a 1–0 victory over Ebusua Dwarfs. He played 2 matches within the competition.

Ahead of the 2020–21 Ghana Premier League season, he was named on the team's squad list as the league was set to restart.

References

External links 
 

Living people
2001 births
Association football midfielders
Dreams F.C. (Ghana) players
Ghanaian footballers
Ghana Premier League players